Hartville is a city in Wright County, Missouri, United States. The population was 594 at the 2020 census. It is the county seat of Wright County.

History
A post office called Hartville has been in operation since 1842. The community was settled in the early 19th century and bears the name of Isaac Hart, a pioneer citizen.

Much of the town was destroyed during the Battle of Hartville in 1863. Lt. Col. John Wimer of the Confederacy, who had served two nonconsecutive terms as mayor of St. Louis, was killed in the battle and was buried at Hartville.

The Grovespring Tornado in 1959 destroyed most of Hartville's business district, including the post office. There were no major injuries since a warning alarm had given the citizens time to take cover.

Kelton House was listed on the National Register of Historic Places in 1983.

Geography
Hartville is located on Missouri routes 5 and 38, along the Wood's Fork of the Gasconade River which flows into the Gasconade just east of the community.

Demographics

2010 census
As of the census of 2010, there were 613 people, 232 households, and 133 families living in the city. The racial makeup of the city was 97.9% White, 0.5% African American, 0.3% Native American, 0.3% Asian, and 1.0% from two or more races. Hispanic or Latino of any race were 2.0% of the population.

There were 232 households, of which 31.5% had children under the age of 18 living with them, 37.5% were married couples living together, 14.7% had a female householder with no husband present, 5.2% had a male householder with no wife present, and 42.7% were non-families. 37.9% of all households were made up of individuals, and 18.9% had someone living alone who was 65 years of age or older. The average household size was 2.34 and the average family size was 3.17.

The median age in the city was 38.5 years. 26.3% of residents were under the age of 18; 8.6% were between the ages of 18 and 24; 21% were from 25 to 44; 22.4% were from 45 to 64; and 21.7% were 65 years of age or older. The gender makeup of the city was 48.6% male and 51.4% female.

2000 census
As of the census of 2000, there were 607 people, 252 households, and 143 families living in the city. The population density was 974.7 people per square mile (378.0/km2). There were 289 housing units at an average density of 464.1 per square mile (180.0/km2). The racial makeup of the city was 97.36% White, 0.99% African American, 1.15% Native American, 0.16% Pacific Islander, and 0.33% from two or more races. Hispanic or Latino of any race were 0.66% of the population.

There were 252 households, out of which 28.2% had children under the age of 18 living with them, 43.7% were married couples living together, 9.9% had a female householder with no husband present, and 42.9% were non-families. 38.1% of all households were made up of individuals, and 27.0% had someone living alone who was 65 years of age or older. The average household size was 2.16 and the average family size was 2.91.

In the city, the population was spread out, with 22.7% under the age of 18, 8.4% from 18 to 24, 20.4% from 25 to 44, 21.1% from 45 to 64, and 27.3% who were 65 years of age or older. The median age was 44 years. For every 100 females, there were 80.1 males. For every 100 females age 18 and over, there were 77.7 males.

The median income for a household in the city was $17,222, and the median income for a family was $27,115. Males had a median income of $20,000 versus $17,969 for females. The per capita income for the city was $11,360. About 18.0% of families and 24.3% of the population were below the poverty line, including 22.1% of those under age 18 and 32.0% of those age 65 or over.

Education
Public education in Hartville is administered by Hartville R-II School District, which operates two elementary schools, one middle school and Hartville High School.

Hartville has a lending library, a branch of the Wright County Library.

Notable person
 Walter Mitchell, bishop of Arizona in the Episcopal Church

References

External links

 Hartville Area Chamber of Commerce
 Hartville R-II School District

Cities in Wright County, Missouri
County seats in Missouri
Cities in Missouri